Lord Beauchamp may refer to:

Baron Beauchamp of Hache
 Baron Beauchamp de Warwick
 Baron Beauchamp of Powick
 Baron Beauchamp de Somerset
 Baron Beauchamp of Bletso
 Beauchamp, Baron St Amand
 Baron Beauchamp of Kidderminster
 Viscount Beauchamp, a subsidiary title of the Marquess of Hertford, second creation
 Viscount Beauchamp of Hache, a subsidiary title of the Duke of Somerset, first creation
 Earl Beauchamp